The Eastend Formation is a stratigraphical unit of Maastrichtian age in the Western Canadian Sedimentary Basin. It takes its name from the town of Eastend, Saskatchewan, and was first described in outcrop around the settlement by L.S. Russell in 1932. The type locality was later defined south-west of the town by W.O. Kupsch in 1956.

Lithology
The Eastend Formation is composed lithic sandstone with volcanic grains, concretionary layers and green-grey shale beds.

Coal beds are found in southern Alberta.

Distribution
The Eastend Formation reaches a thickness of  near the town of Eastend. It is eroded to the north and east, where the Frenchman Formation lies directly over the Bearpaw Formation.

Relationship to other units

The Eastend Formation is conformably overlain by the Whitemud Formation and gradually overlies the Bearpaw Formation. In the Frenchman River valley, the Eastend Formation is erosionally overlain by the Frenchman Formation.

It is equivalent to St. Mary River Formation and Horseshoe Canyon Formation in southern Alberta, as well as the Fox Hills Formation in Montana and North Dakota.

References

Stratigraphy of Saskatchewan
Stratigraphy of Alberta